Music from the Unrealized Film Script: Dusk at Cubist Castle is the debut studio album by the American indie rock band The Olivia Tremor Control, released on 6 August 1996. The album was produced by The Olivia Tremor Control and Robert Schneider, an associate of the band in The Elephant 6 Recording Company collective.

The first few thousand copies of the album were released with a bonus CD, Explanation II: Instrumental Themes and Dream Sequences. It has been claimed that this album will produce quadraphonic sound when played at the same time as that disc. However, the two discs differ in length by approximately five minutes, rendering this an unlikely intention. The Flydaddy 017 release was reissued as a double album with Explanation II as the second disc. This bonus disc was later re-released as a full album by Flydaddy in 1999 but the most recent Cloud Recordings reissues do not include the extra disc.

Background and recording
The Olivia Tremor Control originated as a psychedelic band called Cranberry Lifecycle. This band was formed in Ruston, Louisiana in the late 1980s, by high school friends Will Cullen Hart and Jeff Mangum. After graduating from high school, Hart and Mangum moved to Athens, Georgia, and reworked Cranberry Lifecycle songs under the name Synthetic Flying Machine. Fellow Rustonian Bill Doss joined in 1993, and the lineup consisted of Hart on electric guitar, Doss on bass guitar, and Mangum on drums. The band gained a small following due in part to the psychedelic-infused music, which differed from the prevalent grunge sound in the city. Mangum left the group shortly after its formation, as he wanted to focus on a solo project that would eventually become Neutral Milk Hotel. Doss and Hart then decided to rename the group to the Olivia Tremor Control. Mangum suggested the name, which was intended to be a surreal sounding phrase with no further meaning.

Composition
Dusk at Cubist Castle is a double album that is 74 minutes in length and comprises 27 songs. Critics have described Dusk at Cubist Castle as an eclectic album that encompasses a variety of genres, including indie pop, neo-psychedelia, and psychedelic pop. Jason Ankeny of AllMusic also notes the experimentation with other genres, including krautrock, noise music, and folk rock. While discussing the music as a whole, Stereogum wrote: "Dusk At Cubist Castle is a superhuman effort of maximalist analog production, sonically distended with so many different ideas that it sounds a little different every time you hear it." The album purports to be the soundtrack to an unfinished film titled Dusk at Cubist Castle. However, no such film ever existed.

Paul Thompson of Pitchfork described the first half of the album to be the more immediate and easily accessible half, writing: "Dusk first half is certainly the most immediate stretch of songcraft OTC laid to tape, big, sinewy hooks brought to life in brilliant color ... Catchy as they are, these songs are riddled with potholes, with weird left turns, with hooks that seem to bubble out of nowhere before receding into themselves." Zachary Houle of PopMatters offers similar commentary, and noted how songs on the first half of the album were influenced by artists like Badfinger, David Bowie, The Byrds, and John Lennon. The second half of the album features more experimental songs, influenced by drone music and musique concrète. When asked about the inclusion these experimental songs, Fernandes said: "We wanted to change the way people listen to music ... Make people who love the Beatles also appreciate John Cage." Examples of this experimentation can be found in the suite of ten consecutive songs all titled "Green Typewriters". The eighth song in the suite is nearly ten minutes, and is a drone piece that features the sound of standing bells, typewriter keys, passing cars, and dripping water. The Olivia Tremor Control pokes fun at this with the following song, which opens with the lyric "how much longer can I wait?" The title track is a similar drone piece, and Zachary Houle of PopMatters negatively compared it to "the sort of thing you’d find in a bad Halloween haunted house." Houle does note that not every song on the second half of the album is as experimental, and highlights the final song "NYC-25" as a "jaunty country rock number that leaves an aftertaste of the Beatles yet again."

Dusk at Cubist Caslte focuses on surrealist imagery, in particular dreams. Hart described the album as "dream music for your mind." Thompson identifies the opening song "The Opera House" as an example of lyrical surrealism, as it mentions going to the movie theater to simply watch the actors move their mouths. Other topics include defining a dream that features model headshots of Gertrude Stein and a cosmonaut who is too transfixed on the thoughts in his mind to speak. Many of the lyrics found throughout Dusk at Cubist Caslte are sincere and happy, which Stereogum noted was different from the prevailing ethos of 1990s indie music, which focused on disillusionment and irony. In a 1997 interview, Doss said he wanted the Olivia Tremor Control's music to instill a sense of "mystery or happiness" in listeners. "I'm sending out a positive message, because the world needs it ... We're reaching for something that's hard to explain."

Release and reception

Dusk at Cubist Castle was released on August 6, 1996, by Flydaddy Records. Early CD pressings included a second album titled Explanation II: Instrumental Themes and Dream Sequences. This album contains nine ambient songs, and in the liner notes it is suggested to play the two albums in synchronicity, as this would create quadraphonic sound. The songs "The Opera House" and "Jumping Fences" were released as singles. To promote the album, the Olivia Tremor Control served as an opener for Beck, and toured with Gorky's Zygotic Mynci in 1998. Keyboardist Peter Erchick was brought on as the fifth band member while on tour.

In a contemporary review of Music from the Unrealized Film Script: Dusk at Cubist Castle, Tom Cox of NME called The Olivia Tremor Control "experts at combining the absurd with the uplifting". Jason Cohen of The Austin Chronicle remarked that, with the exception of the "random bursts and transient noise" of "Green Typewriters", Dusk at Cubist Castle is "an embarrassment of pop riches, a mildly psychedelic, lavishly melodic quasi-masterpiece". It ranked at number 37 on The Village Voices year-end Pazz & Jop critics' poll.

Dusk at Cubist Castle was later ranked at number 39 by the online magazine Pitchfork on its list of the best albums of the 1990s.

Track listing 
All songs written by The Olivia Tremor Control.
 "The Opera House" – 3:12
 "Frosted Ambassador"  – 1:02
 "Jumping Fences" – 1:52
 "Define a Transparent Dream"  – 2:49
 "No Growing (Exegesis)" – 3:00
 "Holiday Surprise 1, 2, 3" – 6:11
 "Courtyard" – 2:57
 "Memories of Jacqueline 1906" – 2:15
 "Tropical Bells" – 1:40
 "Can You Come Down with Us?" – 2:18
 "Marking Time" – 4:28
 "Green Typewriters" – 2:22
 "Green Typewriters" – 0:24
 "Green Typewriters" – 0:59
 "Green Typewriters" – 2:11
 "Green Typewriters" – 1:10
 "Green Typewriters" – 0:38
 "Green Typewriters" – 1:38
 "Green Typewriters" – 9:39
 "Green Typewriters" – 1:21
 "Green Typewriters" – 2:39
 "Spring Succeeds" – 2:25
 "Theme for a Very Delicious Grand Piano" – 0:57
 "I Can Smell the Leaves" – 1:50
 "Dusk at Cubist Castle" – 7:35
 "The Gravity Car" – 1:45
 "NYC-25" – 4:39

Personnel 
Instrumentation, vocals and production by The Olivia Tremor Control:
 Bill Doss – instrumentation, vocals, production, artwork and design
 W. Cullen Hart – instrumentation, vocals, production, artwork and design
 Eric Harris – instrumentation, vocals, production
 John Fernandes – instrumentation, vocals, production
Additional instrumentation and production by The Elephant 6 Orchestra:
 Robert Schneider – Tibetan prayer bowl, bass, vocals, melodica, co-production, engineering
 Jeff Mangum – chanter pipe, slide guitar, vocals, melodica, piano and space bubbles
 Julian Koster – bowed electric guitar, mallet struck acoustic guitar and the singing saw
 Steve Jacobek – trumpet
 Rick Benjamin – trombone

Notes

Footnotes

References

1996 debut albums
The Elephant 6 Recording Company albums
The Olivia Tremor Control albums